Carl Tellefsen (September 9, 1854 - October 24, 1908) was a Norwegian-American skiing champion and the first leader of the U.S. Ski and Snowboard Association.

Carl Tellefsen was born in Trondheim, Norway. Tellefsen was active as a ski jumper and was the first leader of the Trondheim Ski Association (Trondheim Skiløberforening)  and the Trondheim Ski  Club (Trondheim Ski  Klub). He emigrated to America in 1887 and settled in Ishpeming, Michigan in March 1888.

In 1956, Carl Tellefsen was the first person to be accorded Honored Membership in the U.S. National Ski Hall of Fame and Museum for his contributions to the sport of skiing.

References

Other sources
Blegen, Theodore C. Norwegian Migration to America, The American Transition (Norwegian-American Historical Association, 1940)
 Pontti, John  and Kenneth Luostari Midwest Skiing: A Glance Back (Arcadia Publishing, 2000)
 Boyum, Burt and Jamie LaFreniere  The Ishpeming Ski Club: Over a Century of Skiing (US National Ski and Hall of Fame Museum, 2003)

External links
U.S. Ski & Snowboard Hall of Fame official website
Carl Tellefsen portrait

1854 births
1908 deaths
American male cross-country skiers
American male ski jumpers
Sportspeople from Trondheim
People from Ishpeming, Michigan
Norwegian emigrants to the United States